Skaftárhreppur is a municipality in southern Iceland. The largest settlement is Kirkjubæjarklaustur.

References 

Municipalities of Iceland